Jacques Lucien Félix Thomas (13 April 1922 — 27 October 1987) was a French tennis player.

A left-handed player from Antibes, Thomas was associated with the Tennis Club de Paris. His best performance at Roland Garros was a fourth round appearance in the 1949 French Championships, where he had been seeded 13th. He played Davis Cup for France in 1949 and 1950. In 1952 he made the doubles final in Monte Carlo.

See also
List of France Davis Cup team representatives

References

External links
 
 
 

1922 births
1987 deaths
French male tennis players
People from Antibes
Sportspeople from Alpes-Maritimes